Stanisław Potocki may refer to:
Stanisław "Rewera" Potocki, 1579–1667, hetman, voivode, podkomorzy,
Stanisław Potocki (1659-1683), son of Andrzej Potocki
Stanisław Potocki (died 1760), voivode
Stanisław Potocki (1734–1802), krajczy
Stanisław Szczęsny Potocki (1753–1805), voivode, Artillery General
Stanisław Potocki (1782-1831), Russian commander in the Patriotic War of 1812, son of Stanisław Szczęsny
Stanisław Kostka Potocki (1755–1821), podstoli, Artillery General
Stanisław Antoni Potocki (1837–1884)

See also
Aleksander Stanisław Potocki (1778–1845) castellan
 Potocki family